Under Southern Skies may refer to:

 Under Southern Skies (1902 film), an Australian documentary
 Under Southern Skies (1915 film), a lost American silent film drama
 Under Southern Skies (video game), 1984 video game by Avalon Hill